The East Village Other (often abbreviated as EVO) was an American underground newspaper in New York City, issued biweekly during the 1960s. It was described by The New York Times as "a New York newspaper so countercultural that it made The Village Voice look like a church circular".

Published by Walter Bowart, EVO was among the first countercultural newspapers to emerge. EVO was one of the founding members of the Underground Press Syndicate, a network that allowed member papers to freely reprint each other's contents.

The paper's design, in its first years, was characterized by Dadaistic montages and absurdist, non-sequitur headlines. Later, the paper evolved a more colorful psychedelic layout that became a distinguishing characteristic of the underground papers of the time.

EVO was an important publication for the underground comix movement, featuring comic strips by artists including Robert Crumb, Kim Deitch, Trina Robbins, Spain Rodriguez, Gilbert Shelton and Art Spiegelman, before underground comic books emerged from San Francisco with the first issue of Zap Comix.

Publication history
The East Village Other was co-founded in October 1965 by Walter Bowart, Ishmael Reed (who named the newspaper), Allen Katzman, Dan Rattiner, Sherry Needham, and John Wilcock. It began as a monthly and then went biweekly.

Starting in 1969, Coca Crystal would write about politics, women's issues, and personal events for the East Village Other, many of which earned her the title "slumgoddess".

The paper published another short-lived spin-off title, Kiss, a sex-oriented paper that was designed to compete with Al Goldstein's tabloid Screw. There were several other spin-off titles published at the same time, including Gay Power (a New York–centric gay liberation paper which survived for about a year), and a brief-lived astrology paper.

In 1968, Bowart departed, moving to Tucson, Arizona, where he founded Omen Press, publishing metaphysical books. 

In 1970, EVO had a circulation of 65,000 copies.

As 1971 drew to a close, publication of EVO became more and more sporadic. It faced mounting financial difficulties, along with increasing staff losses, and the paper ceased publication forever in March 1972.

Comics
Early EVO issues featured the work of Bill Beckman, Shelton, and Rodriguez, soon adding other artists. The popularity of these strips led to the publication of separate comics tabloids, beginning with Zodiac Mindwarp by Rodriguez. 

Comics historian Patrick Rosenkranz recalled his reaction to EVO:

During 1969, EVO published eight issues of Gothic Blimp Works, an all-comics tabloid with some color printing, billed as "the first Sunday underground comic paper". Vaughn Bodé was the founding editor, with early issues featuring work by Bodé, Crumb, Deitch, Robbins, Rodriguez, Spiegelman, Joel Beck, Roger Brand, Ron Haydock, Jay Lynch, Larry Hama, Michael Kaluta, George Metzger, Ralph Reese, Steve Stiles, Robert Williams, S. Clay Wilson, Bernie Wrightson and Bhob Stewart (who became Gothic Blimp Works second editor).

See also
 List of underground newspapers of the 1960s counterculture

References

Further reading
 Katzman, Allen. Our Time: An Anthology of Interviews from the East Village Other. New York: Dial Press, 1972. .

External links
 EVO (8/20/69): John Hilgerdt on Woodstock (full text)
 EastVillageOther.org (website with much info, scanned issues, graphics, photographs)
 May 14, 1969 edition of East Village Other, from Luminist Periodical Archives.

1965 establishments in New York City
1972 disestablishments in New York (state)
Alternative weekly newspapers published in the United States
Counterculture of the 1960s
Defunct newspapers published in New York City
Publications established in 1965
Publications disestablished in 1972
Underground comix
Underground press